Guanzhuang is the name of several places in the People's Republic of China:

Guanzhuang (管庄)
 Guanzhuang, Beijing, a district of Beijing
 Guǎnzhuang station, Beijing Subway

Guanzhuang (关庄)
 Guānzhuang station, Beijing Subway

Guanzhuang (官庄)
 Guanzhuang, Qianshan County, Anhui Province
 Guanzhuang, Jiangyan, Jiangsu Province
 Guanzhuang, Yuanling (官庄镇),  a town of Yuanling County, Hunan
 Guanzhuang, Zhangqiu, Zhangqiu, Jinan, Shandong